Distremocephalus californicus is a species of glowworm beetle in the family Phengodidae. It is found in Central America and North America.

References

Further reading

 
 
 

Phengodidae
Bioluminescent insects